St. Catherine Hall, original known as St. Rose's Residence Hall, is a building on the now defunct Marylhurst University campus in Marylhurst, Oregon, United States. It was built during the 1930s. The university closed in late 2018.

References

External links
 

1930s architecture in the United States
1930s establishments in Oregon
Buildings and structures completed in the 1930s
Marylhurst University